Serious Times may refer to:

 Serious Times (Horace Andy album), 2010
 Serious Times (Luciano album), 2004